Dolneni is a municipality in the central part of North Macedonia. Dolneni is also the name of the village where the municipal seat is found. The municipality is part of the Pelagonia Statistical Region.

Geography
The municipality borders Čaška Municipality to the northeast, Prilep Municipality to the southeast, Krivogaštani Municipality to the south, Kruševo Municipality to the southwest, and Makedonski Brod Municipality to the northwest.

Demographics

According to the last national census from 2021 this municipality has 13,126 inhabitants.

Ethnic groups in the municipality include:

Inhabited places

There are 36 inhabited places in this municipality.

References

 
Pelagonia Statistical Region
Municipalities of North Macedonia